Anca Muscholl (born 1967) is a Romanian-German mathematical logician and theoretical computer scientist known for her work on formal verification, model checking, and two-variable logic.

Education and career
Muscholl was born in Bucharest, came to Germany as a teenage refugee in 1984, and won first place in two German national mathematics competitions (the ) in 1985 and 1986. She earned a master's degree at the Technical University of Munich, and completed her Ph.D. at the University of Stuttgart in 1994. Her dissertation, Über die Erkennbarkeit unendlicher Spuren, was supervised by Volker Diekert and published by Tuebner in 1996. She also earned a habilitation at the University of Stuttgart in 1999.

After becoming a professor at Paris Diderot University in 1999, she moved to the University of Bordeaux in 2006.

Recognition
Muscholl was a junior member of the Institut Universitaire de France from 2007 to 2012. She won the CNRS Silver Medal in 2010.

References

External links
Home page

1967 births
Living people
People from Bucharest
20th-century German mathematicians
German women mathematicians
German computer scientists
German women computer scientists
Romanian emigrants to Germany
Romanian refugees
Theoretical computer scientists
Mathematical logicians
Women logicians
Technical University of Munich alumni
University of Stuttgart alumni
Academic staff of the University of Bordeaux
Academic staff of Paris Diderot University
21st-century German mathematicians